The Capim River is a river in the state of Pará, Brazil. It is a tributary of the Guamá River.

The Gurupí, Capim and Guamá rivers flow into the mouth of the Amazon and are affected by the daily tides, which force water from the Amazon upstream.
They are in the Tocantins–Araguaia–Maranhão moist forests ecoregion.

References

Sources

Rivers of Pará